Ryan Patrick Winkler (born December 30, 1975) is an American politician and the former majority leader of the Minnesota House of Representatives. A member of the Minnesota Democratic–Farmer–Labor Party (DFL), he represented District 46A, which includes portions of the cities of Golden Valley, Plymouth, and St. Louis Park in Hennepin County.

In February 2018, Winkler announced his intentions to run for the legislative office he previously held in District 46A. He was re-elected, succeeding Peggy Flanagan, who had left the house to run for lieutenant governor.

DFL legislators elected Winkler to serve as Majority Leader in November 2018, and he took office in January 2019.

Winkler announced that he will retire from the Minnesota House of Representatives at the end of his 2021–2023 term. He went on to run in the DFL primary election for Hennepin County Attorney on August 9, 2022, finishing in 3rd place.

Education
Winkler graduated with a B.A. in history from Harvard University in 1998 and J.D. from the University of Minnesota Law School in 2001.

Minnesota House of Representatives
He was first elected in 2006, and was re-elected in 2008, 2010, 2012, and 2014.

In 2021, legalizing recreational marijuana came up for a vote in front of the Minnesota House of Representatives for the first time. Winkler was a lead proponent of the push.

Elections

Resignation
On May 21, 2015, Winkler announced he would resign effective July 1, 2015.  His wife at the time, Jenny, accepted a job as an executive with the Rezidor Hotel Group, which is headquartered in Brussels, Belgium, and his family moved there to support her.

Comments on Voting Rights Act lawsuit
Following the United States Supreme Court's decision in Shelby County v. Holder, Winkler took to Twitter to write, "VRA majority is four accomplices to race discrimination and one Uncle Thomas" referring to Justice Clarence Thomas, an African American. "Uncle Tom" is a derogatory used against blacks who are perceived as being apologetic for their race. Winkler later deleted the tweet and posted, "Deleted Tweet causing offense regarding Justice Thomas. I apologize for it, but believe VRA decision does abet racism." On Twitter, he added that he did not understand "Uncle Tom" as a racist term.

Personal life
Winkler is Lutheran and has Norwegian ancestry. He has three sons.

References

External links

1975 births
21st-century American politicians
American Lutherans
Democratic Party members of the Minnesota House of Representatives
Harvard College alumni
Living people
People from Bemidji, Minnesota
University of Minnesota Law School alumni